Elections to the Pembroke Urban District Council took place on Monday 16 January 1899 as part of that year's Irish local elections.

Unlike some of the elections elsewhere in Ireland, the election was not explicitly contested on Nationalist/Unionist grounds. Instead, the election largely saw a new group of 'Ratepayers' candidates, together with several Independents, challenge the incumbent Town Commissioners on their historic administration of the district.

The result saw Nationalists elected to the council for the first time.

Following the election Sir Robert Jackson was elected Chairman, replacing Col. Davoren.

Results by party

Ward Results

References

1899 Irish local elections
1899